WCMH-TV (channel 4) is a television station in Columbus, Ohio, United States, affiliated with NBC and owned by Nexstar Media Group. The station's studios are located on Olentangy River Road near the Ohio State University campus, and its transmitter is located on Twin Rivers Drive, west of downtown Columbus.

History
Columbus' first television station began operations on April 3, 1949 as WLWC on channel 3. The station's original owner was the Cincinnati-based Crosley Broadcasting Corporation, a division of the Avco Company. Crosley also owned WLW radio and WLWT television in Cincinnati, as well as WLWD television (now WDTN) in Dayton. Together these stations comprised the "WLW Television Network", a regional group of inter-connected stations. Until the mid-1960s, the stations emphasized their connection to each other within their on-air branding; the Columbus station was known as WLW-C. The station's studios were originally located in the Seneca Hotel in downtown Columbus before WLWC moved into their present facility on Olentangy River Road, five months after the station signed on.

Like all of the WLW television stations in Ohio, WLWC was an NBC affiliate, though it carried some programming from the DuMont network until WTVN-TV (now WSYX) took the DuMont affiliation when that station launched in September 1949. In 1952, following the release of the Federal Communications Commission (FCC)'s Sixth Report and Order which ended the four-year freeze on station license awards, a VHF frequency realignment resulted in WLWC being forced to move to channel 4, trading channels with then-NBC-owned WNBK (now WKYC) in Cleveland; the switch took place in June 1953.

The Crosley TV station group would later grow to include WLWA (now WXIA-TV) in Atlanta, WLWI (now WTHR) in Indianapolis, and WOAI-TV in San Antonio. Along with NBC programming, the Crosley stations in Ohio and Indianapolis also aired common programming, including The Paul Dixon Show, Midwestern Hayride, The Ruth Lyons 50-50 Club (later to become The Bob Braun Show), The Phil Donahue Show, and telecasts of Cincinnati Reds baseball; WLWC originated coverage of the Ohio State Fair, which was also carried in Cincinnati and Dayton. The Crosley broadcast division took the name of its parent company in 1968, becoming Avco Broadcasting Corporation.

In 1969, the FCC enacted its "one-to-a-market" rule, which prohibited common ownership of AM radio and television stations with overlapping coverage areas under certain conditions while grandfathering some already existing instances. Avco's ownership of WLWC, WLWT, WLWD, and WLW radio (a 50,000-watt, clear-channel station which can also be heard throughout much of eastern North America at night) was granted protection under the clause. But as a condition of maintaining three television stations with common coverage areas Crosley/Avco operated WLWC, WLWT, and WLWD with shorter transmission towers. In 1975, Avco announced the sale of its broadcasting outlets; channel 4 was sold in February 1976 to the Providence, Rhode Island-based Outlet Company, who then changed the station's call letters to the current WCMH-TV on the 3rd. The call letters were selected to match the IATA airport code for Port Columbus International Airport, "CMH".

For many years, WLWC/WCMH-TV has shared NBC programming in the eastern part of the market with WHIZ-TV (channel 18) in Zanesville despite channel 4 itself covering Zanesville and covering weather reports as far east as Cambridge (part of the Wheeling, West Virginia/Steubenville, Ohio market and served by WTOV-TV for NBC) and all other major network affiliates in Columbus covering Muskingum County as default affiliates, since Zanesville is considered a separate TV market from Columbus. WHIZ-TV would also serve somewhat as a buffer for WCMH-TV after WTAE-TV in Pittsburgh signed on in 1958 and had to "box in" its signal to protect then-WLWC and three other stations also broadcasting on channel 4.

Outlet merged with NBC in 1996, and channel 4 became an NBC owned-and-operated station, spending much of the next decade as one of two stations in the market to hold this status; the other was UPN's WWHO, (channel 53, owned by that network's corporate parent Viacom from 1997 to 2005). From 1996 to 1999, channel 4 was technically a sister station to Cleveland's WKYC through NBC's minority ownership of that station, though they had ceded operational control to Gannett (now Tegna Inc., which now also owns WBNS-TV) by that point.

WCMH-TV was placed up for sale by NBCUniversal on January 9, 2006, along with sister stations WJAR-TV in Providence, WVTM-TV in Birmingham, Alabama, and WNCN-TV in Goldsboro, North Carolina. Media General, the Richmond, Virginia-based company which already owned five NBC affiliates in the southeastern United States, announced it would purchase the four stations on April 6, 2006; the sale was finalized on June 26, 2006. As a result, channel 4 became Media General's first station in the Great Lakes region.

For several months after the sale closed, WCMH's website and those of the other three stations remained in the format used by the websites of NBC-owned stations. In December 2006, WNCN and WJAR launched redesigned websites, which are no longer powered by Internet Broadcasting. On December 11, 2006, WVTM's website followed suit, followed by WCMH on December 14. Media General has since located the master control for all Media General NBC affiliates at its Columbus studios. In 2013, Media General migrated its television station web sites to Worldnow (who provided video services to the company's in-house web site operations prior to the hosting deal). Following the company's takeover by the principal staff of LIN, the Media General station web sites are now hosted by WordPress.com.

With subsequent sales and affiliation switches involving the other three stations NBC sold to Media General in 2006, WCMH was the last of the four that had had both the same owner and the same network affiliation that it had since 2006. (WJAR and WVTM were sold to Sinclair and Hearst Television, respectively, in 2014, while WNCN switched its network affiliation from NBC to CBS in 2016.) WCMH would be reunited with WDTN (the former WLWD) in 2014 when Media General purchased LIN Media, which also made WCMH a sister station to LIN's properties in Youngstown (CBS affiliate WKBN-TV, Fox affiliate WYFX-LD, and ABC-affiliated SSA partner WYTV) within Ohio.

On January 27, 2016, it was announced that the Nexstar Broadcasting Group would buy Media General for $4.6 billion. WCMH became part of "Nexstar Media Group." The deal closed on January 17, 2017. Following the acquisitions of West Virginia Media Holdings (which closed two weeks after the Media General deal) and Tribune Media in 2019, WCMH is now a sister station to four other stations serving Ohio: Fox affiliate WJW in Cleveland, CBS affiliates WOWK-TV in Charleston–Huntington, West Virginia and WTRF-TV in Wheeling–Steubenville, and NBC affiliate WDTN in Dayton.

News operation 

WCMH presently broadcasts 49 hours of locally produced newscasts each week (with eight hours each weekday, five hours on Saturdays and four hours on Sundays); in regards to the number of hours devoted to news programming, it is the highest local newscast output among the Columbus market's television stations on an individual basis, though WSYX currently broadcasts 63½ hours of local newscasts per week on both its main signal and WSYX 6.3.

For most of its history, WLWC/WCMH-TV has been second in the Columbus ratings, except for the station's 11:00 p.m. news, which occasionally beats market leader WBNS-TV. Typical with Nexstar-owned stations, WCMH-TV generally carries a straight newscast with emphasis on local coverage; WBNS-TV drifted away from such coverage and more towards lifestyle news under Tegna ownership while WSYX has long favored a more activist-style approach. Channel 4 has also emphasized community involvement and reporters with local roots such as current evening anchor Kerry Charles, a native of Columbus's Linden neighborhood.

From 1957 to 1980 Hugh DeMoss anchored channel 4's evening newscasts, called The DeMoss Report; following the sale of the station to Outlet, the broadcasts were rebranded as NewsWatch 4. During the late 70s into the early 80s, the station languished in third place. But channel 4's fortunes began to change when, in 1983, the station brought in veteran news anchor Doug Adair and his then-wife, reporter Mona Scott, from WKYC-TV in Cleveland as the station's main anchoring team. They continued the "happy talk" format as well as launching the 5:30 p.m. newscast.  WCMH began a slow rise that would result in the station overcoming WBNS to reach number-one in the market, and in the process, the mid-1980s NewsWatch 4 team of Adair, Scott, meteorologist Jym Ganahl (with the station from 1979 until retiring in September 2016, currently at WSYX), and sportscaster Jimmy Crum (who joined the station shortly after its 1949 debut) became the most popular anchor team in Columbus television history. This also coincided with NBC's becoming the number one network during that time.

The 1990s brought changes to the normally stable WCMH-TV. In 1990, personal reasons forced Mona Scott to leave channel 4, and she was replaced at the anchor desk by Angela Pace. Pace would leave for WBNS-TV in 1992, and Doug Adair and Jimmy Crum both retired in 1994. WCMH's new anchoring team featured Colleen Marshall, who had been a reporter for the station since the mid-1980s; and Cabot Rea, a former weekend sports anchor and weekday features reporter. The pair helmed WCMH-TV's evening newscasts until Rea's retirement on December 18, 2015. Marshall and Rea worked together overall for 23 years, the longest tenured co-anchoring team in Columbus television history.

The changes resulted in an earlier audience fall-off, but channel 4 once again passed WBNS-TV for the overall lead for a time in the late 1990s and early 2000s, and often won 11 o'clock news ratings over WBNS (due to NBC winning prime time and late night ratings over CBS during those years). For much of the first decade of the new millennium, WCMH also won the morning news race, but the numbers dropped precipitously after the broadcast was moved into NBC 4 on the Square, a downtown studio facility located on Broad and High streets, in 2008.

On January 4, 2008 WCMH became the second major Columbus station to begin broadcasting local newscasts in high definition. Prior to the opening of NBC 4 on the Square on May 27, channel 4 had planned to move its entire news operation to that facility. However, when those plans fell through, WCMH's main studio was upgraded to high definition. (Ultimately, NBC 4 on the Square was used only for some of the station's weekday morning shows.) Like most other stations with high-definition newscasts, WCMH relied mostly on upconverted 16:9 widescreen standard definition footage for its remote field reports until the summer of 2014 where all remote field operations were upgrade to 16:9 1080i HD. On May 11, 2011, NBC 4 on the Square came to an end due to dismal ratings (it has remained a distant second to WBNS-TV on weekday mornings ever since NBC4 on the Square was founded), with the morning newscast productions returning to the main WCMH facility full-time, and the downtown space was soon leased to WBNS-TV.

In January 2011, the station debuted a new rounded logo and new image promos emphasizing its long-time personalities and community involvement.

Notable current on-air staff
 Brad Johansen – Midday (11am-12:30 pm) and 4 p.m. anchor

Notable alumni
 Doug Adair (anchor, 1983-1994; deceased)
 Leon Bibb (now at WKYC in Cleveland)
 Diann Burns (last with WBBM-TV in Chicago)
 Nick Clooney – host of The Nick Clooney Show
 Bill Hindman – news anchor and later a stage actor
 Robin Meade (now morning anchor with CNN Headline News)
 Larry Mendte (last at KYW-TV in Philadelphia; last at WPIX in New York City)
 Dean Miller – Prior to joining WLW-C, Miller was co-star of the CBS sitcom December Bride (1954–1959); and co-host of the NBC celebrity interview program Here's Hollywood; later a news anchor for WDIV-TV in Detroit and owner of radio station WMVR-FM (105.5) in Sidney, Ohio (which is still owned by the Miller family)
 Erin Moriarty – lawyer, news reporter and correspondent for 60 Minutes, 48 Hours, CBS This Morning and CBS Evening News with Dan Rather and formerly co-anchor of PM Magazine while in Columbus in 1979-1980. She has also been seen narrating recent episodes of 48 Hours Mystery. 
 Cabot Rea – Now retired after 30 years
 Marty Reid – last with ESPN

Technical information

Subchannels
The station's digital signal is multiplexed:

WCMH replaced RTV with MeTV on September 26, 2011, as part of a groupwide affiliation agreement with Media General; the channel replaced RTV on some Media General-owned stations in other markets. MeTV was replaced by Court TV on September 26, 2019.

Analog-to-digital conversion 
WCMH-TV shut down its analog signal, over VHF channel 4, on June 12, 2009, as part of the federally mandated transition from analog to digital television. The station's digital signal remained on its pre-transition UHF channel 14, using PSIP to display WCMH-TV's virtual channel as 4 on digital television receivers.

NextGen TV upgrade
As part of a deal between Nexstar and Sinclair Broadcast Group (owner of WSYX and operator of WTTE and WWHO), on January 7, 2021, WCMH-TV started hosting the ATSC 1.0 channel for WWHO 53.3 as part of Columbus's adoption of ATSC 3.0 using the HVEC video compression standard. Simultaneous with the move, WCMH-TV's main signal is now broadcasting in ATSC 3.0 on WWHO alongside WWHO's main signal, WSYX 6.3 (the former intellectual property of WTTE), and WTTE 28.2. The move left WBNS-TV as the only major network station in Columbus not broadcasting in ATSC 3.0 in some capacity.

Video links

 1955 WLW Weathercast - Weather and news reports originated from WLW-T and were relayed to each station by microwave link for broadcast to Columbus, Cincinnati and Dayton audiences. The "Three City Final" newscast aired on WLW-C until December, 1957; WLW-T weather forecasts continued to air until 1965 or 1966.
 Jack Hanna Visits Bob Braun - Bob Braun and his predecessor Ruth Lyons hosted a talk show live weekdays at noon on the WLW stations in Columbus, Cincinnati, Indianapolis and Dayton.
 Paul Dixon Show - Another staple of WLW regional programming was the Paul Dixon Show originating in Cincinnati and airing mornings on all WLW stations.  Comedian and talk show host David Letterman credits Paul Dixon as being the inspiration for his show.
 1956 WLWC Sign-Off (Audio Only) - Original WLWC audio from 1956.
 1980s WCMH-TV Sign-Off
 Spook Beckman's Coffee Club (mid-1960s)
 Dance Party Video The Edicates performing live on WLWC's "Dance Party", hosted by Jerry Rasor (November 11, 1969)
 Kate Smith Tribute to WLW-C - Kate Smith's Third Birthday Tribute to WLW-C (April 3, 1952)

References

External links
 

CMH-TV
NBC network affiliates
Court TV affiliates
Ion Television affiliates
Laff (TV network) affiliates
Nexstar Media Group
Television channels and stations established in 1949
1949 establishments in Ohio
Former General Electric subsidiaries